In hyperbolic 3-space, the order-6 tetrahedral honeycomb is a paracompact regular space-filling tessellation (or honeycomb). It is paracompact because it has vertex figures composed of an infinite number of faces, and has all vertices as ideal points at infinity. With Schläfli symbol {3,3,6}, the order-6 tetrahedral honeycomb has six ideal tetrahedra around each edge. All vertices are ideal, with infinitely many tetrahedra existing around each vertex in a triangular tiling vertex figure.

Symmetry constructions 

The order-6 tetrahedral honeycomb has a second construction as a uniform honeycomb, with Schläfli symbol {3,3[3]}. This construction contains alternating types, or colors, of tetrahedral cells. In Coxeter notation, this half symmetry is represented as [3,3,6,1+] ↔ [3,((3,3,3))], or [3,3[3]]:  ↔ .

Related polytopes and honeycombs 

The order-6 tetrahedral honeycomb is similar to the two-dimensional infinite-order triangular tiling, {3,∞}. Both tessellations are regular, and only contain triangles and ideal vertices.

The order-6 tetrahedral honeycomb is also a regular hyperbolic honeycomb in 3-space, and one of 11 which are paracompact.

This honeycomb is one of 15 uniform paracompact honeycombs in the [6,3,3] Coxeter group, along with its dual, the hexagonal tiling honeycomb.

The order-6 tetrahedral honeycomb is part of a sequence of regular polychora and honeycombs with tetrahedral cells.

It is also part of a sequence of honeycombs with triangular tiling vertex figures.

Rectified order-6 tetrahedral honeycomb 

The rectified order-6 tetrahedral honeycomb, t1{3,3,6} has octahedral and triangular tiling cells arranged in a hexagonal prism vertex figure.
 Perspective projection view within Poincaré disk model

Truncated order-6 tetrahedral honeycomb 

The truncated order-6 tetrahedral honeycomb, t0,1{3,3,6} has truncated tetrahedron and triangular tiling cells arranged in a hexagonal pyramid vertex figure.

Bitruncated order-6 tetrahedral honeycomb 

The bitruncated order-6 tetrahedral honeycomb is equivalent to the bitruncated hexagonal tiling honeycomb.

Cantellated order-6 tetrahedral honeycomb 

The cantellated order-6 tetrahedral honeycomb, t0,2{3,3,6} has cuboctahedron, trihexagonal tiling, and hexagonal prism cells arranged in an isosceles triangular prism vertex figure.

Cantitruncated order-6 tetrahedral honeycomb 

The cantitruncated order-6 tetrahedral honeycomb, t0,1,2{3,3,6} has truncated octahedron, hexagonal tiling, and hexagonal prism cells connected in a mirrored sphenoid vertex figure.

Runcinated order-6 tetrahedral honeycomb 

The bitruncated order-6 tetrahedral honeycomb is equivalent to the bitruncated hexagonal tiling honeycomb.

Runcitruncated order-6 tetrahedral honeycomb 

The runcitruncated order-6 tetrahedral honeycomb is equivalent to the runcicantellated hexagonal tiling honeycomb.

Runcicantellated order-6 tetrahedral honeycomb 

The runcicantellated order-6 tetrahedral honeycomb is equivalent to the runcitruncated hexagonal tiling honeycomb.

Omnitruncated order-6 tetrahedral honeycomb 

The omnitruncated order-6 tetrahedral honeycomb is equivalent to the omnitruncated hexagonal tiling honeycomb.

See also 
 Convex uniform honeycombs in hyperbolic space
 Regular tessellations of hyperbolic 3-space
 Paracompact uniform honeycombs

References 

Coxeter, Regular Polytopes, 3rd. ed., Dover Publications, 1973. . (Tables I and II: Regular polytopes and honeycombs, pp. 294–296)
 The Beauty of Geometry: Twelve Essays (1999), Dover Publications,  (Chapter 10, Regular Honeycombs in Hyperbolic Space) Table III
 Jeffrey R. Weeks The Shape of Space, 2nd edition  (Chapter 16-17: Geometries on Three-manifolds I,II)
 Norman Johnson Uniform Polytopes, Manuscript
 N.W. Johnson: The Theory of Uniform Polytopes and Honeycombs, Ph.D. Dissertation, University of Toronto, 1966 
 N.W. Johnson: Geometries and Transformations, (2018) Chapter 13: Hyperbolic Coxeter groups

Honeycombs (geometry)